Burley High School is a four-year secondary school in Burley, Idaho, the largest of four traditional high schools in the Cassia County School District #151.  Its official title is Burley Senior High School and it has only had its 2100 Park Ave. address since the doors opened for the Spring Semester of 1999.  The previous school was built in the 1950s, residing at the locally known address of #1 Bobcat Boulevard, and the building still exists as a satellite campus for the College of Southern Idaho.  Until the 2006–07 school year, it was exclusively a three-year senior high school, with the freshman class attending  Burley Junior High School.

The facilities include the King Fine Arts Center at the southwest corner of the school. The school also includes Skagg's Field, a sports complex built in 2008.

Athletics
Burley competes in athletics in IHSAA Class 4A the second-highest classification, and is a member of the Great Basin (West) Conference with Minico (near Rupert), Jerome, and Wood River (Hailey). In August 2009, the conference added Twin Falls and just-opened Canyon Ridge, both located in Twin Falls.

State titles
Boys
 Basketball (6): 1935, 1941, (A-1, now 5A) 1991, (A-2, now 4A) 1992; (4A) 2007, 2008  
 Track (2): 1921, 1922 (one class) 

Girls
 Basketball (1): (4A) 2007  (introduced in 1976)

References

External links

Cassia County School District # 151

Public high schools in Idaho
Schools in Cassia County, Idaho
1999 establishments in Idaho